There are two rivers in Wiltshire, England, named Avon:
  River Avon (Bristol), which flows through the north of the county and into the Bristol Channel at Avonmouth, Bristol
 River Avon (Hampshire), which flows through Salisbury and into the English Channel at Christchurch on the border of Dorset and Hampshire